Gymnopilus ornatulus is a species of mushroom in the family Hymenogastraceae.

See also

List of Gymnopilus species

External links
Gymnopilus ornatulus at Index Fungorum

ornatulus
Fungi of North America
Taxa named by William Alphonso Murrill